Charles William Vane, 3rd Marquess of Londonderry,  (born Charles William Stewart; 1778–1854), was an Anglo-Irish nobleman, a British soldier and a politician. He served in the French Revolutionary Wars, in the suppression of the Irish Rebellion of 1798, and in the Napoleonic wars. He excelled as a cavalry commander in the Peninsular War (1807–1814) under John Moore and Arthur Wellesley (became Wellington in 1809).

On resigning from his post under Wellington in 1812, his half-brother Lord Castlereagh helped him to launch a diplomatic career. He was posted to Berlin in 1813, and then as ambassador to Austria, where his half-brother was the British plenipotentiary at the Congress of Vienna.

He married Lady Catherine Bligh in 1804 and then, in 1819, Lady Frances Anne Vane, a rich heiress, changing his surname to hers, thus becoming Charles Vane instead of Charles Stewart. In 1822 he succeeded his half-brother as 3rd Marquess of Londonderry, inheriting estates in the north of Ireland where, as an unyielding landlord, his reputation suffered in the Great Famine. It was a reputation he matched as a coal operator on his wife's land in County Durham. In opposition to the Mines and Collieries Act of 1842, he insisted on his right to use child labour.

Birth and origins 
Charles was born on 18 May 1778 in Dublin as the second son of Robert Stewart and the first son by his second wife Frances Pratt. His father's family was Ulster-Scots and Presbyterian. His father was then a wealthy member of the Irish landed gentry but would later be created a Marquess.

Charles's mother was English, a daughter of Charles Pratt, 1st Earl Camden, a leading English jurist. His parents had married on 7 June 1775. Charles was brought up as an Anglican, a member of the Church of Ireland.

Charles had a half-brother from his father's first marriage:
 Robert (1769–1822), known as "Castlereagh", who became a famous statesman.

This half-brother played an important role in his life.

In addition Charles had 11 full siblings, who are listed in his father's article.

Early life and parliamentary career 
In 1789, when he was 11, his father, Robert Stewart, was created Baron Londonderry.

On 3 April 1791, at the age of 12, Charles Stewart entered the British Army as an ensign in the 108th Regiment. He was commissioned a lieutenant on 8 January 1793 in this same unit. He saw service in 1794 in the Flanders Campaign of the French Revolutionary Wars, and on the Rhine and Danube in 1795.

He was lieutenant-colonel of the 5th Royal Irish Dragoons by the time he helped put down the Irish Rebellion of 1798. In 1803, Stewart was appointed aide-de-camp to King George III.

In 1795 his father was created Viscount Castlereagh and in 1796 Marquess of Londonderry in the Irish peerage.

In 1800, Charles Stewart was elected in the Tory interest to the Irish House of Commons as member of parliament for Thomastown borough, County Kilkenny, in place of George Dunbar, and after only two months exchanged this seat for that of Londonderry County, being replaced at Thomastown by John Cradock. After the abolition of the Irish Parliament with the Act of Union in 1801, In July and August 1802 Stewart was re-elected for the country in the first general election of the United Kingdom and sat until the parliament's dissolution in 1806. He was reelected again in 1806, in 1807, after which he became Under-Secretary of State for War and the Colonies, and again in 1812. In July 1814 he was summoned to the House of Lords.and replaced as MP for Londonderry by his uncle Alexander Stewart of Ards.

First marriage and son 
On 8 August 1804 at the church of St George's, Hanover Square, London, Charles Stewart married Lady Catherine Bligh. She was the 4th and youngest daughter of the 3rd Earl of Darnley. She was three years older than he. On 7 July 1805 the couple had a son, named Frederick, who was to become the 4th Marquess of Londonderry. She died during the night of 10–11 February 1812, of fever following a minor operation, while her husband was on his way home from Spain.

 
Son by Catherine Bligh:
 Frederick William Robert Stewart, 4th Marquess of Londonderry (1805–1872)

Peninsular War 
The remainder of his military career developed during the Napoleonic Wars, more exactly in the Peninsular War.

Corunna 
The war started with the Corunna Campaign (1808–1809), in which the British troops were commanded by Sir John Moore. In this campaign Charles Stewart commanded a brigade of cavalry, and played, together with Lord Paget, a prominent role in the cavalry clash of Benavente where the French General Lefebvre-Desnouettes was taken prisoner. He suffered from ophthalmia during the latter stages of the retreat. Moore sent him back to London carrying dispatches for Castlereagh and other leading figures and he missed the climactic battle where British forces successfully managed to evacuate in the face of Marshal Soult's army at which Moore was killed in action.

Wellesley's Spanish campaign 
When British troops returned to the Iberian Peninsula after the Corunna Campaign, they were commanded by Sir Arthur Wellesley (later the Duke of Wellington). Charles Stewart was appointed, in April 1809, Adjutant General to Wellesley. This was an administrative job and not much to his liking, especially as Wellesley never discussed his decisions with subordinates. Nevertheless, he sometimes managed to see action and distinguished himself, particularly at the battle of Talavera (July 1809) for which he received the thanks of the Parliament on 2 February 1810 when he returned to England on sick leave. He also excelled at Bussaco in September 1810 and at Fuentes de Oñoro (May 1811) where he took a French Colonel prisoner in single combat.

He resigned his position as Adjutant General in February 1812. Some say due to bad health, but others say that Wellington fired him. Wellington apparently appreciated him as a soldier but judged him a "sad brouillon and mischief-maker" among his staff.

On 30 January 1813 he became a Knight Companion of the Bath, which made him Sir Charles Stewart. On 20 November 1813, he was made Colonel of the 25th Light Dragoons, an honorary position.

Diplomatic career 
His half-brother Robert had made a brilliant diplomatic and political career. Charles and his half-brother remained lifelong friends and wrote each other many letters. Robert helped Charles to start a diplomatic career.

Berlin 
From May 1813 until the end of the war, Sir Charles was Envoy Extraordinary and Minister Plenipotentiary to Berlin, and was also Military Commissioner with the allied armies, being wounded at the Battle of Kulm in August 1813.

Vienna 
In 1814 he was also appointed Ambassador to Austria, a post he held for nine years (1814–1823). On 18 June 1814, to make him more acceptable in Vienna, Stewart was ennobled as Baron Stewart, of Stewart's Court and Ballylawn in County Donegal, by the Prince Regent. In the same year, he received honorary degrees from Oxford and Cambridge, was admitted to the Privy Council, and was appointed a Lord of the Bedchamber to the King.

Lord Stewart, as he now was, attended the Congress of Vienna with his half-brother Lord Castlereagh as one of the British plenipotentiaries. He was not well regarded as he made a spectacle of himself with his loutish behaviour, was apparently rather often inebriated, and frequented prostitutes quite openly. He earned himself the sobriquet of Lord Pumpernickel after a loutish character in a play in fashion.

Second marriage and children 

Before the end of his diplomatic career Lord Stewart had, on 3 April 1819, married his second wife, Lady Frances Anne Vane-Tempest, daughter and heiress of Sir Henry Vane-Tempest, at her mother's house in Bruton Street, Mayfair, and took her surname of Vane, by Royal licence, as had been stipulated in her father's will. He was henceforth known as Charles William Vane, whereas his son out of his first marriage stayed Frederick Stewart.

 
Children by Frances Anne Emily Vane-Tempest:
 George Henry Robert Charles William Vane-Tempest, 5th Marquess of Londonderry (1821–1884)
 Lady Frances Anne Emily Vane (1822–1899); married John Spencer-Churchill, 7th Duke of Marlborough.
 Lady Alexandrina Octavia Maria Vane (1823–1874), godchild of Alexander I of Russia; married Henry Dawson-Damer, 3rd Earl of Portarlington.
 Lord Adolphus Frederick Charles William Vane-Tempest (1825–1864), politician; became insane, and had to be medically restrained.
 Lady Adelaide Emelina Caroline Vane (c. 1830–1882); disgraced the family by eloping with her brother's tutor, Rev. Frederick Henry Law.
 Lord Ernest McDonnell Vane-Tempest (1836–1885), fell in with a press-gang and had to be bought a commission in the army, from which he was subsequently cashiered.

Through his daughter Lady Frances, Lord Londonderry is the maternal grandfather of Lord Randolph Churchill, and consequently a great-grandfather of Winston Churchill.

Castlereagh's suicide 
On 12 August 1822, his half-brother committed suicide. He succeeded his half-brother as 3rd Marquess of Londonderry in 1822. The following year Lord Londonderry was also created Earl Vane and Viscount Seaham, of Seaham in the County Palatine of Durham, with remainder to the heirs male of the body of his second wife.

His half-brother's death also meant the end of his diplomatic career. He quit the diplomatic service in 1823. Queen Victoria had a low esteem of Londonderry's abilities as a civil servant. She said that he should, in her opinion, not be given any post of importance.

Residences 

Lord Londonderry used his new bride's immense wealth to acquire the Seaham Hall estate in County Durham, developing the coalfields there. He also built the harbour at Seaham, to rival nearby Sunderland. He commissioned Benjamin Wyatt to build a mansion at Wynyard Park. It was completed by Philip Wyatt in 1841 and cost £130,000 (equivalent to £10,772,000 in 2016) to build and furnish. Unfortunately, just as the mansion was being completed, a fire broke out and gutted the house; it was later restored and remodelled by Ignatius Bonomi.

The family also used their newfound wealth to redecorate their country seat in Ireland, Mount Stewart, and bought Holdernesse House on London's Park Lane, which they renamed Londonderry House.

Declines Orange invitation 
In 1836 the Orange Order was accused of plotting to place Ernest Augustus, Duke of Cumberland and Imperial Grand Master of the Orange Order, on the throne in place of Victoria when his brother King William IV died. Once the plot was revealed, the House of Commons called upon the King to disband the Order. Under pressure from Joseph Hume, William Molesworth and Lord John Russell, the King indicated measures would have to be taken and the Duke of Cumberland was forced to dissolve the Orange lodges.

Hume laid evidence before the House of Commons that the plotters had approached Londonderry. In July 1832, the Marquess had received a letter from Lieutenant-Colonel W. B. Fairman, the Deputy Grand Secretary of the Orange Institution of Great Britain, advising him that following "a death of importance" (the passing of the King) the Orangemen would abandon their policy of "non-resistance" to the present "Popish Cabinet, and democratical Ministry" (the parliamentary reform ministry of Earl Grey) and that "it might be political" for the Marquess to join them. Noting that there were already Orange lodges in Newcastle, South Shields, and Darlington, Fairman also suggested to Londonderry that to assume the role in Durham of County Grand Master might be advantageous to him "in a personal sense": his "pitmen" (the miners employed in his collieries) might be induced to organise lodges among themselves which would "prove a partial check against their entering into cabals [i.e. trade unions] hereafter".

While he conceded that he wished the government should do more to check "the baneful influence of the Liberal and Radical associations", including trade unions, Londonderry went to some length in the House of Lords to deny any possible connection between himself and "the alleged project for altering the succession to the throne". To Fairman he had replied: "the present state of liberal Whig feeling in this very Whig county, and the very refractory and insubordinate state of the pitmen, entirely preclude the possibility of successful efforts at this juncture". He had also spoken with Lord Kenyon (his then house guest, who had led opposition to Catholic Emancipation) and had "no doubt" he would "convince his Royal Highness" (the Duke of Cumberland), as well as Fairman, "that the present moment is not the time when the object can be forwarded."

Industrialist and landlord

Mines and Collieries Act 
Londonderry led the opposition to the Mines and Collieries Act of 1842 in the House of Lords. He is reported to have raged furiously against any attempt to deny the collieries the use of child labour. Speaking on behalf of the Yorkshire Coal-Owners Association, Londonderry said "With respect to the age at which males should be admitted into mines, the members of this association have unanimously agreed to fix it at eight years... In the thin coal mines it is more especially requisite that boys, varying in age from eight to fourteen, should be employed; as the underground roads could not be made of sufficient height for taller persons without incurring an outlay so great as to render the working of such mines unprofitable".

Irish famine 

By the time of the outbreak of the Great Irish Famine in 1845, Londonderry was one of the ten richest men in the United Kingdom. While many landlords made efforts to mitigate the worst effects of the famine on their tenants, Londonderry was criticised for meanness: he and his wife gave only £30 to the local relief committee but spent £15,000 renovating Mount Stewart, their Irish home, and on grounds of "personal inconvenience" rejected rent reductions (for which he was excoriated by James MacKnight in the Presbyterian weekly, the Banner of Ulster).

During the tenant right campaign of the early 1850s, Londonderry insisted on his full rights and this alienated many of his tenants. He was in disagreement over this question with his eldest son and heir Frederick, who was more liberally inclined.

Napoleon and Abd-el-Kader 
Back in England, Londonderry befriended Louis-Napoléon Bonaparte (later Napoleon III) while the latter was exiled in London between 1836 and 1840. After Bonaparte had been elected president of France in 1851, Londonderry asked him to free Abd-el-Kader.

Late honours 
Governor of County Londonderry from 1823, Londonderry was appointed Lord Lieutenant of Durham in 1842 and the following year became Colonel of the 2nd Regiment of Life Guards. When Wellington, whom he admired greatly, died in 1852, his place as Knight of the Garter was given to Londonderry, who was officially invested on 19 June 1853.

Death, memorials, and succession 

He died on 6 March 1854 at Londonderry House and was buried in Longnewton, County Durham. His widow honoured him by the Londonderry Equestrian Statue in Durham.

Frederick built Scrabo Tower near Newtownards as a monument to the memory of his father. Of the 730 subscribers to the cost, just 450 were connected to the Stewart estate on which there were 1,200 tenants farmers and many associated employees (in 1850, organised in the all-Ireland Tenant Right League, 700 of these tenants had signed an address demanding tenant right and lower rents). Two-thirds of the cost of the tower was met by 98 subscribers (in a list headed by Emperor Napoleon III) most of whom were fellow gentry.*

He was succeeded as Marquess of Londonderry by his eldest son, Frederick Stewart, the only child from his first marriage, and as Earl Vane by George Vane, the eldest son from his second marriage. At Charles's death Frederick, therefore, became the 4th Marquess of Londonderry, whereas George became the 2nd Earl Vane. George was later to become the 5th Marquess after his half-brother had died childless.

Styles 
Charles was styled:
 The Honourable Charles Stewart from 1789 until 1813 (because his father was created Baron Londonderry in 1789), 
 The Honourable Sir Charles Stewart from 1813 to 1814 (because he was made a Knight of the Bath), 
 The Right Honourable The Lord Stewart from 1814 to 1822 (because he was made a baron in his own right)
 The Most Honourable The Marquess of Londonderry.

Works 
The 3rd Marquess was a prolific writer and editor. He wrote books about his own military and diplomatic career and published many of his half-brother's papers.

War memoirs 
The following two books describe the Napoleonic War as he saw them happen. The first describes his experience of the Peninsular War. The second the War of the Sixth Coalition, which forced Napoleon to abdicate:
 Narrative of the Peninsular War (London: Henry Colburn, 1828) online at Internet Archive
 Narrative of the War in Germany and France: In 1813 and 1814 (London: Henry Colburn and Richard Bentley, 1830) online at Internet Archive

Castlereagh papers 
The 3rd Marquess also compiled, edited, and published many of the papers left by his half-brother and published them in the following twelve volumes, divided in three series.

The first series, consisting of four volumes, numbered 1 – 4, appeared in 1848 and 1849 under the title Memoirs and Correspondence. The volumes are not marked "first series on the title pages. They are:
 Memoirs and Correspondence of Viscount Castlereagh, Second Marquess of Londonderry, Volume 1 (London: Henry Colburn, 1848) online at Internet Archive - The Irish Rebellion
 Memoirs and Correspondence of Viscount Castlereagh, Second Marquess of Londonderry, Volume 2 (London: Henry Colburn, 1848) online at Internet Archive - Arrangements for a Union
 Memoirs and Correspondence of Viscount Castlereagh, Second Marquess of Londonderry, Volume 3 (London: Henry Colburn, 1849) online at Internet Archive - Completion of the Legislative Union 
 Memoirs and Correspondence of Viscount Castlereagh, Second Marquess of Londonderry, Volume 4 (London, Henry Colburn, 1849) online at Internet Archive - Concessions to Catholics and Dissenters: Emmett's Insurrection

The second series, consisting of four volumes, appeared in 1851 under the title Correspondence, Despatches and Other Papers. The volume numbers continue, despite being marked "2nd series" and are therefore 4 to 8. They are:
 Correspondence Despatches and Other Papers of Viscount Castlereagh, Second Marquess of Londonderry, Series 2, Volume 5 (London: William Shoberl, 1851) online at Internet Archive - Military and Miscellaneous
 Correspondence Despatches and Other Papers of Viscount Castlereagh, Second Marquess of Londonderry, Series 2, Volume 6 (London: William Shoberl, 1851) online at Internet Archive - Military and Miscellaneous
 Correspondence Despatches and Other Papers of Viscount Castlereagh, Second Marquess of Londonderry, Series 2, Volume 7 (London: William Shoberl, 1851) online at Internet Archive - Military and Miscellaneous
 Correspondence Despatches and Other Papers of Viscount Castlereagh, Second Marquess of Londonderry, Series 2, Volume 8 (London: William Shoberl, 1851) online at Internet Archive - Military and Miscellaneous

The third series appeared in 1853. The four volumes have the same title as the second series. The volume numbering is irregular. They are:
 Correspondence Despatches and Other Papers of Viscount Castlereagh, Second Marquess of Londonderry, Volume 9 (London: John Murray, 1853) online at Internet Archive - Military and Diplomatic
 Correspondence Despatches and Other Papers of Viscount Castlereagh, Second Marquess of Londonderry, Volume 11 (London: John Murray, 1853) online at Hathi Trust
 Correspondence Despatches and Other Papers of Viscount Castlereagh, Second Marquess of Londonderry, Series 3, Volume 3 (London: John Murray, 1853) online at Internet Archive - Military and Diplomatic
 Correspondence Despatches and Other Papers of Viscount Castlereagh, Second Marquess of Londonderry, Volume 12 (London: John Murray, 1853) online at Internet Archive

See also 
 Marquess of Londonderry – for his title
 Earl Camden – for his maternal grandfather's title
 Vane-Tempest baronets – for the title of his father-in-law Sir Henry Vane-Tempest

Notes and references

Notes

Citations

Sources 

 
 
 
 
 
 
  – L to M
  – (later events)
  – (for timeline)

External links 
 

 

1778 births
1854 deaths
5th Royal Irish Lancers officers
10th Royal Hussars officers
British Army personnel of the Napoleonic Wars
British Army personnel of the Peninsular War
British Life Guards officers
Diplomatic peers
Irish MPs 1798–1800
Knights Grand Cross of the Order of the Bath
Knights of the Garter
Lord-Lieutenants of Durham
3
Stewart, Charles, Lord
Stewart, Charles, Lord
Stewart, Charles, Lord
Members of the Privy Council of the United Kingdom
Peers of the United Kingdom created by George III
Peers of the United Kingdom created by George IV
Stewart, Charles
Nobility from Dublin (city)
People educated at Eton College
People of the Irish Rebellion of 1798
Recipients of the Army Gold Medal
Stewart, Charles
Stewart, Charles
Stewart, Charles
Stewart, Charles
Stewart, Charles
Londonderry, M3
UK MPs who were granted peerages
Charles
Military personnel from Dublin (city)
Politicians from Dublin (city)
V